The Ngauranga Interchange at the foot of the Ngauranga Gorge is a major interchange in the suburb of Ngauranga, in Wellington City, New Zealand. The Ngauranga interchange connects State Highways 1 and 2  with each other and also to Hutt Road for access to the interisland ferry terminals and alternative access to Wellington City. The majority of traffic in and out of Wellington City uses this interchange.

It is the southern terminus of State Highway 2.

Design
The interchange connects State Highways 1 and 2 to the Wellington Urban Motorway.

Southbound traffic on SH1 may continue onto the Wellington Urban Motorway or exit before the interchange and proceed through the adjacent intersection to Hutt Road or to SH2.

Southbound traffic on SH2 may continue onto the Wellington Urban Motorway or exit before the interchange and proceed through the intersection to Hutt Road or to SH1.

Northbound Wellington Urban Motorway traffic may proceed straight ahead for SH2 or veer left for SH1 at the interchange.

Similarly northbound Hutt Road traffic may proceed straight ahead for SH2 or veer left for SH1 at the intersection.

Hutt Road and the Wellington Urban Motorway run parallel to each other from Wellington to Ngauranga.

History
Before the construction of the Wellington Urban Motorway, the interchange comprised a single set of traffic lights between Hutt Road (SH2) and Centennial Drive (SH1).

On opening of the Wellington Urban Motorway in 1969, the interchange was modified to a fork. Traffic from SH2 could exit for Hutt Road and SH1, or could proceed straight for the motorway. At the traffic lights, vehicles from SH1 could turn right for Hutt Road and Wellington, or turn left for the SH2 towards the Hutt Valley. SH1 traffic could not access the motorway.

The opening of two ramps in 1984 allowed traffic from SH1 to access the motorway directly. This is how the junction remains today.

Roads in New Zealand
Road interchanges in New Zealand
Transport in Wellington
Wellington City
State Highway 1 (New Zealand)